Jean-Marc Berlière is a French historian who specialises in the history of the French police. He works as a Professor at the University of Burgundy. In 1991, he completed a Doctoral thesis on the Police of the French Third Republic.

Besides having written a number of history books, Berlière has also participated in many television documentaries. He was an historical expert on Who Do You Think You Are? where he helped explain to Davina McCall the role her grandfather played in the Dreyfus Affair.

References

Year of birth missing (living people)
Living people
21st-century French historians
Historians of France
History of law enforcement in France
Academic staff of the University of Burgundy
French male non-fiction writers
20th-century French historians